Edward Kiwanuka Ssekandi (born 19 January 1942) is a Ugandan politician and lawyer who served as the eighth vice president of Uganda from 24 May 2011 to 21 June 2021. Prior to that, he served as the Speaker of Parliament from 2001 to 2011. He served as Member of Parliament for Bukoto County Central constituency from 1996 to 2021.

Life and career 
Ssekandi was born in Masaka District on 19 January 1942. He graduated with honors from the University of East Africa with a Bachelor of Laws degree. He also holds a Diploma in Legal Practice from the Law Development Center in Kampala, Uganda's capital and largest city.

From 1973 until 1978, he served as a lecturer at the Uganda Law Development Centre. Between 1978 and 1979, he served as the Acting Director of the Law Development Centre. He was the lead counsel on the Commission of Inquiry into Violations of Human Rights, between 1986 and 1993. He was a delegate to the Constitutional Assembly, which drafted the 1995 Ugandan constitution, from 1994 until 1995.

In 1996, Edward Ssekandi was elected to the Ugandan Parliament to represent Bukoto County Central, located in Masaka District. He was re-elected from that constituency in 2001, 2006 and 2011. He served as Deputy Speaker of Parliament from 1996 to 2001. He was elected as Speaker in 2001, a position he held until 2011. He was replaced as Speaker by Rebecca Kadaga, the first female Speaker of Parliament in Uganda's history, on 19 May 2011.

Personal details
He is married. He belongs to the National Resistance Movement political party. He is reported to be a sports enthusiast.

See also
 Parliament of Uganda
 List of speakers of the Parliament of Uganda

References

External links
 Ssekandi To Run In 2016

1942 births
Living people
20th-century Ugandan lawyers
Ugandan Roman Catholics
Vice presidents of Uganda
People from Masaka District
Law Development Centre alumni
Academic staff of the Law Development Centre
University of East Africa alumni
Members of the Parliament of Uganda
Speakers of the Parliament of Uganda
National Resistance Movement politicians
People educated at St. Mary's College Kisubi
21st-century Ugandan politicians